Paul Miller (born 12 February 1963) is a former Australian racing cyclist. He won the Australian national road race title in 1988.

References

External links

1963 births
Living people
Australian male cyclists
People from Kalgoorlie